The fourth season of You Can Dance: Po prostu tańcz!. The dancers compete to win PLN 100,000 and a 3-month scholarship in dance school Broadway Dance Center, but first they have to go through auditions. Later, 36 contestants do the workshops abroad – this season in Lisbon, Portugal. This seasons on choreography camp special guest choreographer was Laurie Ann Gibson. From sixteen people, two dancers are eliminated in each episode, to the final episode that features the two contestants. The show is hosted by Kinga Rusin. The judges are Agustin Egurrola, Michał Piróg and Weronika Marczuk-Pazura. It premiered on March 4, 2009. Anna Kapera was announced as the winner on June 5, 2009.

Auditions
Season Background Song: Poker Face – Lady Gaga
Open auditions for this season were held in the following locations:
 Wrocław
 Kraków
 Gdańsk
 Białystok
 Warszawa

The song during Sneek Peeks at the end of the episode is Just Lose It – Eminem

Top 36 dancers
During the auditions judges picked 36 dancers. These dancers were taking part in choreography camp in Lisboa, Portugal.

These dancers were shown only in youcandance.tvn.pl website extras.
These dancers weren't shown anywhere.
These dancers earned the tickets after choreography round.

Returning Dancers
This season there were some returning dancers, who were trying their chances last seasons.

Choreography Camp (Lizbona) week 
Judges: Agustin Egurrola, Weronika Marczuk-Pazura, Michał Piróg

Eliminations during Choreography Camp

Dancers were practising choreographies during first three days of the Camp. Then there were no cuts, judges gave some dancers, who didn't handle the choreographies well yellow cards, second yellow equals red card.
After rehearsals contestants performed only in chosen by choreographer style, then judges made cuts.
After these cuts remaining contestants moved to Final Choreography round with special guest star Laurie Ann Gibson

Cuts after first round: Marika Netzel, Anna Kasprzak, Paulina Figińska, Mateusz Agiejczyk, Sylwia Jarzyńska, Krystian Waszkiewicz, Brajan Poniatowski, Paweł Olewiński, Sylwia Dymek, Adrian Wilczko, Katarzyna Wach, Łukasz Szotko, Piotr Dąbrowski.
Cuts after Final Choreography round: Anna Szymoniak, Piotr Abramowicz, Ewa Radew, Krzysztof Kulling, Magdalena Grzela.
Cuts after dancing for live: Michalina Twarowska, Martyna Majak, Jakub Konieczny.

 Anna Szymoniak was cut after Final Choreography round, but because of low level solos at dancing for live she was asked to perform her solo, and she moved to the top 16.

Top 16 Contestants

Women

Men

Elimination chart

Performance nights

Week 1: Top 16 (April 8, 2009)

Group Dance: Deep Inside — Masters at Work/I Don't Like The Look of This – Da Backwudz  (House/Hip-Hop; Choreographer: Filip Czeszyk)
Guest Dancers: 
Maciej "Gleba Florek & Anna Bosak, Artur Ciecórski & Katarzyna Kubalska, Wioletta Fiuk & Gabriel Piotrowski (Finalists of previous series) – Freedom – George Michael
Rafał "Roofi" Kamiński, Ida Nowakowska, Natalia Madejczyk, Anna Bosak, Maria Foryś Maciej "Gleba" Florek, Artur Ciecórski, Wioletta Fiuk – Yahiii, Yahaiieee – Magda Miton & Afromental/Fight For Your Life – Afromental & Andy Stewlocks Ninvall
Top 16 Couple dances:

Bottom 3 Couples solos:

Eliminated:
Barbara Zielińska
Mieszko Wiśniewski

Week 2: Top 14 (April 22, 2009)

Group Dance: Sorry (remix) — Madonna (Modern Jazz; Choreographer: Katarzyna Kizior)
Top 14 Couple dances:

Bottom 3 Couples solos:

Eliminated:
Anna Szymoniak
Jurij Żurajew

Week 3: Top 12 (April 29, 2009)

Group Dance: Show Me Love (Safari mix) — Mobin Masters & Robin S & Karina Chavez (Hip-Hop; Choreographer: Gabriel Francisco)
Top 10 Couple dances:

Bottom 3 Couples solos:

Eliminated:
Adrianna Piechówka
Maksymilian Hać

Week 4: Top 10 (May 6, 2009)

Group Dance: Cloud Nine — Evanescence (Contemporary; Choreographer: Mariusz Olszewski)
Top 10 Couple Dances:

Bottom 3 Couples solos:

Eliminated*:
Kaja Kudełko
Rafał Kabungwe

Week 5: Top 8 (May 13, 2009)

Group Dances:

Top 8 Couple dances:

Bottom 3 Couples solos:

Eliminated:
Eliza Kindziuk
Jakub Werel

Week 6: Top 6 (May 20, 2009)

Group Dance: Let Me Entertain You – Robbie Williams (Jazz; Choreographer: Jonathan Huor) 
Guest Dancers: Swing Latino: Quimbara – Celia Cruz & Johnny Pacheco
Top 6 Couple dances:

Top 6's solos:

Eliminated:
Klaudia "Jadżka" Koruba
Paweł Kulik

Week 7: Semi-Finale – Top 4 (May 27, 2009)

Group Dance: Right Round – Flo Rida ft. Kesha (Hip-Hop; Choreographer: Joao Assuncao)
Guest Dancers: SPOKO – Fix Up – Dizzie Rascal/Bass Phenomeon – Krafty Kutz/It's Me Bitches – Swizz Beats
Top 4 Couple dances:

Top 4's solos:

Eliminated:
Julia Żytko
Piotr Jeznach

Week 8: Finale – Top 2 (June 3, 2009)

Group dances:

Guest Dancers:
Wioletta Fiuk & Marcin Mroziński (Both season 3): Homeless – Leona Lewis
Fair Play Crew (Rafał "Roofi" Kamiński, Piotr Gałczyk, Błażej Górski, Gabriel Piotrowski, Karol Niecikowski, Piotr Jeznach, Piotr Abramowicz: Latin Thugs – Cypress Hill/U Can't Tell Me Nuffin – Dizzie Rascal/Waiting on the World to Change – John Mayer/Za Dużo Chcesz – ABC/Pushin' – Frank Stallone & Ray Pizzi & Jerry Hey
Top 2 Couple dances:

Top 2 solos:

Results:
Winner: Anna Kapera
Runner-up: Łukasz Zięba

First for any So You Think You Can Dance series
On top 14 show there was first ever Wacking routine, it was danced by Adrianna Piechówka and Jakub Werel.

First for You Can Dance – Po Prostu Tańcz!
 First ever Wacking. Top 14 Adrianna Piechówka & Jakub Werel.
 In finale there were two dancers. In semi finale there were two dancers eliminated as at every other stage of the competition.

Rating Figures

External links
So You Think You Can Dance Poland Official Website

Season 04